Azerbaijani Anime Convention,, or simply AzeCON, is an annual anime convention held in Azerbaijan. It is the first and only anime convention in Azerbaijan. The main goal of the convention is to bring together all of the anime, manga/comics and modern Japanese culture fans in Azerbaijan. There were six AzeCONs held since its debut.

The convention was intended to be held twice a year, in summer and winter, but at the end, it became annual. Anime conventional entertainments include: karaoke, just dance, treasure hunting, stage show, Japanese anime café, video games, animanga-themed stands, cosplay competition, and photo sessions. A cosplay contest is held in two nominations, individual and team. The mascot of the convention is a female anime character called "Ayna".

Conventions held

References 

Anime conventions
Recurring events established in 2014
2014 establishments in Azerbaijan